Sebastes flammeus is a species of fish in the rockfish family found in the northwest Pacific.

Taxonomy
Sebastes flammeus was first formally described in 1904 as Sebastodes flammeus by the American ichthyologists David Starr Jordan and Edwin Chapin Starks with the type locality given as Misaki in Japan. It has been suggested by some studies that this taxon is a junior synonym of S. iracundus.  authorities classify this species in the subgenus Acutomentum. The specific name flammeus means “flame red”.

Distribution, habitat and biology
Sebastes flammeus is found in the northwestern Pacific Ocean off norther Japan. It is an ovoviviparous fish which lives near the bottom.

References

External links
 
 

flammeus
Fish described in 1904
Taxa named by David Starr Jordan
Taxa named by Edwin Chapin Starks